Almahmoud (Arabic:   ال محمود) is a Sunni Arab family based in some parts of Saudi Arabia (the other family called Almahmoud who are of Arab origins are based in Bahrain, Saudi Arabia, the UAE and Qatar). As sadah, they trace their ancestry to prophet Muhammad through his daughter Fatima.

Ancestry
They are descendants of bin Mansoor bin Abdulqadir bin Mohammad bin Ali bin Hamid bin Yaseen bin Hamad bin Nasser bin Abdul-latif bin Elyas bin Abdulwahab bin Sheikh al-Deen bin Abdulrahman bin Sheikh al-Deen bin Abdulrazaq bin Tahir bin Husam al-Deen bin Jalal al-Deen bin Sultan bin Ahmad bin Shihab al-Deen bin Rahmat-Allah bin Fatkhan bin Abdullah bin Ibrahim bin Isa bin Ali bin al-Husayn bin Musa bin Mezan bin Haroon bin Khalid al-Rasi bin al-Qassim bin Muhammad al-Hadi Yahi bin Hussain bin al-Qassim al-Mursi bin Ibrahim Tabataba bin Ismail bin Ibrahim bin al-Hasan al-Muthana bin al-Hasan bin Ali. They are Ali's descendants from his wife Fatima, the prophet Muhammad's daughter's side.

Famous Ulama
 Sheikh Mohammed bin Ibrahim Almahmoud
 Sheikh Omar bin Mohammed bin Ibrahim Almahmoud
 Sheikh Abdullah bin Zaid Almahmoud
 Sheikh Abdullatif Almahmoud
 Sheikh Abdulrahman bin Saleh Almahmoud
 Sheikh Abdul Nasser Omar Almahmoud

References

Books and sources that mention Almahmoud's ancestry
 http://www.midad.com/arts/category/90

Hasanids